The Centro Universitário Ritter dos Reis ("Ritter dos Reis University Center" in English), better known as UniRitter, is a university in Brazil, with two campuses in the cities of Canoas and Porto Alegre, the state capital of Rio Grande do Sul. Through these campuses it serves more than 6,000 students.

UniRitter was founded on October 18, 1971, by the educator Romeu Ritter dos Reis.

In 2010, it became part of the Laureate International Universities network.

Degree programs

Undergraduate programs
UniRitter offers undergraduate degrees in:
 Business Administration
 International Relations
 Law
 Mechanical Engineering
 Manufacturing Engineering
 Civil Engineering
 Information Systems
 Digital Game Design
 Design
 Architecture and Urban Planning
 Journalism
 Publicity and Propaganda
 Languages
 Pedagogy
 Biomedicine
 Physiotherapy

Graduate programs
 Business Administration
 Architecture and Urban Planning
 Design
 Law
 Information Systems
 Languages
 Pedagogy

References

External links
 Official Website (in Portuguese)

Universities and colleges in Porto Alegre
Educational institutions established in 1971
Canoas
Private universities and colleges in Brazil